Still Life: Flowers (Nature morte: fleurs) is an oil on canvas by Pierre-Auguste Renoir in the Thannhauser Collection at the Guggenheim Museum, New York.    

This 1885 painting is similar to Still Life: Flowers and Prickly Pears believed to be painted a year earlier, but in this case Renoir did not include the fruit and table cloth and was more restrained in his use of color.

References

1885 paintings
Paintings by Pierre-Auguste Renoir
Still life paintings
Paintings in the collection of the Solomon R. Guggenheim Museum